The Chokin' Kind is the fourth studio album recorded by American singer Joe Simon, released in 1969 on the Sound Stage 7 label.

Chart performance
The album peaked at No. 18 on the R&B albums chart and No. 81 on the Billboard Top LPs chart. The album features the title track, which peaked at No. 1 on the Hot Soul Singles chart and No. 13 on the Billboard Hot 100, "Baby, Don't Be Looking in My Mind", which charted at No. 16 on the Hot Soul Singles chart and No. 72 on the Billboard Hot 100, and "Yours Love", which reached No. 10 on the Hot Soul Singles Chart and No. 78 on the Billboard Hot 100.

Track listing

Charts

Singles

References

External links
 

1969 albums
Joe Simon (musician) albums